Media room may refer to:
 A home cinema, home theater room, television room, or other bonus room
 A newsroom or press room